Jiashan Road is an interchange station between Lines 9 and 12 of the Shanghai Metro. The station came into operation on 31 December 2009 with the opening of line 9. It became an interchange station on 19 December 2015 with the opening of line 12.

Station Layout 

Railway stations in Shanghai
Shanghai Metro stations in Xuhui District
Railway stations in China opened in 2009
Line 9, Shanghai Metro
Line 12, Shanghai Metro